The Bing Rooming House Museum (also known as the Bing-Washington House) is a museum in a historic residence in the Lincoln Park neighborhood Plant City, Florida, United States at 205 South Allen Street. It was built about 1928 as a boarding house and was operated by Mrs. Janie Wheeler Bing for African-Americans who were not allowed to stay in segregated white hotels or eat in white restaurants. On September 14, 2002, it was added to the U.S. National Register of Historic Places. It has been renovated. The museum is open Monday through Thursday from 2 pm to 6 pm.

References

External links

 Hillsborough County listings at National Register of Historic Places
 Hillsborough County listings at Florida's Office of Cultural and Historical Programs

Houses on the National Register of Historic Places in Hillsborough County, Florida
1928 establishments in Florida
Plant City, Florida
Houses completed in 1928
African-American history of Florida